Churchbridge is a town in the province of Saskatchewan, Canada, located at the junction of the Yellowhead Highway (Highway 16), and Highway 80. Churchbridge is a part of the rural municipality of Churchbridge 211, which is located within Saskatchewan Association of Rural Municipalities (SARM) Division No. 1 and census division Number 5.

History
Churchbridge began with the arrival of settlers from the Anglican Colonization Society, with director and missionary Reverend Robert Bridger.

The village of Churchbridge was incorporated in 1903 with James Heasman as the overseer. He was solely responsible for the affairs of the village. There was no council, but M. Thorlakson and A.O. Berger, both hotel keepers, were trustees, which meant they made themselves responsible for the honesty and integrity of the overseer in his financial duties. In 1962, there were 260 people residing the village, and by 1964, the population had risen to 600. The village became a town in 1964.

Geography
Churchbridge is located north of Big Cut Arm Creek and Deer Creek which drain into the Assiniboine River.

Demographics 

Economy
Churchbridge is a community with an excellent location along Highway 16 for business. The Mosaic Potash mines to the south of employ many residents of Churchbridge and surrounding area, including nearby towns Esterhazy, Langenburg, and Bredenbury.

Amenities
Over the years Churchbridge has grown. The community has a school, a library, a fire department, a daycare, and recreation facilities (including a new swimming pool).

Sites of interest
Sites of interest in the town include the Coin Monument erected to celebrate the 125th anniversary of Canadian Confederation, Veteran's Memorial Wall, photo archives and the many heritage murals displayed throughout the community. These displays of art were created by local artists to help commemorate various events, as well as to honour former residents.

Duck Mountain Provincial Park is located north on Highway 80; Asessippi Ski Area and Lake of the Prairies is located just east on Highway 16.

Churchbridge Campground is located south of the junction of Highway 16 and 80. The campground offers 33 sites - 29 electrified, pull through sites, grass covered sites for tents, sewer dump, washroom and shower facility. Across the road is a picnic area, swimming pool, playground and ball diamonds.

Located within  is the Langenburg Recreation Site.

The Saltcoats Game Preserve is within .

Transportation
Churchbridge Airport supplies limited air service to this Saskatchewan town. The main mode of transportation would be via Saskatchewan Highway 16, the Yellowhead Route, and to a lesser extent via the north/south secondary highway, Saskatchewan Highway 80.

As of the early 1900s, Churchbridge was a part of the Minnedosa, Saskatoon, Edmonton section of the Canadian Pacific Railway.

Publications
A local history and family biography book written for the province's 75th anniversary by Ruth Swanson and published by the Churchbridge History Committee and is entitled: The first hundred years: around Churchbridge, 1880-1980.

Media 
The Four-Town Journal newspaper covers Churchbridge and its surrounding area. The Company was established by Bill Johnston in 1980 and was purchased by Ryan Stanko in 2019.

Notable people
 Darleen Bogart, Braille literacy advocate
 Lionel G. Heinrich, professional Canadian ice hockey player.
 Kevin S. Kaminski, professional Canadian ice hockey player.
 Hal Sigurdson, sports journalist

See also
List of communities in Saskatchewan

References

Towns in Saskatchewan
Churchbridge No. 211, Saskatchewan
Division No. 5, Saskatchewan